Bell Yu Tian is a Malaysian singer-songwriter and music producer from Malacca.

Career 
Bell Yu Tian is a songwriter and singer from Malaysia. She started her career in the entertainment industry in 2012 with her own composition titled Bring Me Away for the film Paper Moon. She not only sang the song, she was also the composer, producer, back up vocal, song arranger and pianist.
Her songs and album topped the chart in Malaysia and she won numerous awards as the best new coming artiste in Malaysia. She also represented Malaysia in 2014 in Hong Kong for the Asian Pop Music Festival and won the best performer award. In 2012, she released the album Sunny and subsequently has released a number of singles as well as film compositions.

Album

Singles

Awards

Music scoring

References

External links

21st-century Malaysian women singers
Malaysian women songwriters
Living people
People from Malacca
1982 births